Academy member Frida Torresblanco is an independent awarded Film, Television, and Documentary producer based in New York City.

She has produced a variety of independent films including The Dancer Upstairs (directed by John Malkovich), The Assassination of Richard Nixon (starring Sean Penn), Disobedience (directed by Sebastian Lelio with Rachel Weisz (The Favourite) Rachel McAdams (Spotlight) and Alessandro Nivola, (American Hustle), Pan’s Labyrinth (directed by Guillermo del Toro). In 2002, Frida launched a New York-based film production company, Esperanto Filmoj, in partnership with Alfonso Cuarón. She produced Cronicas (starring John Leguizamo) and Año Uña (directed by Jonás Cuarón), The Possibility of Hope (directed by Alfonso Cuarón), and Rudo y Cursi (directed by Carlos Cuarón).

In 2006, Frida joined Alfonso Cuarón and Guillermo del Toro to produce Pan's Labyrinth, which won three Academy Awards, three BAFTAs, a nomination for the Palme d'Or and a Golden Globe. The following year, the Hollywood Reporter named her the 34th Most Powerful Latino in Hollywood, and 13th on the magazine’s list of Latino Women Power 25.

In 2010, Frida launched her production company Braven Films. The company’s first film, Magic Magic (directed by Sebastian Silva, starring Michael Cera) was released in 2013. Under a beneficial First-Look Deal with Viacom International [1], Frida is currently developing multiple TV series with Viacom, including Chosen Damages, Artemisia and Sinaloa's First Lady.

Early life and career 

Frida graduated from The Complutense University in Madrid, where she completed BA Master's degrees in both literature and film, specializing in post-production and new media. While still a student, she began working as an assistant director, Line Producer, and finally as a Producer. She later joined Lolafilms as head of all international productions in English, including The Dancer Upstairs (directed by John Malkovich) and Susan Seidelman’s Gaudi Afternoon (starring Marcia Gay Harden and many more.  Frida worked with many prominent Spanish directors including Carlos Saura, Fernando Trueba, Manuel Iborra, and Emilio Martinez Lazaro.

In 2002, Frida moved to New York City to launch a film production company Esperanto Filmoj in partnership with Alfonso Cuarón. She served as Executive Producer and Creative On-Set Producer for The Assassination of Richard Nixon (directed by Niels Mueller and starring Sean Penn) and Cronicas (directed by Sebastián Cordero and starring John Leguizamo). She also produced Año Uña (directed by Jonás Cuarón), The Possibility of Hope (directed by Alfonso Cuarón), and Rudo y Cursi (directed by Carlos Cuarón). Rudo y Cursi (starring Gael García Bernal and Diego Luna) premiered at the 2009 Sundance Film Festival and has gone on to become one of the highest-grossing films in Mexican history, making over 11 million dollars [2].

In 2006, after eight years of partnership, Frida worked with Alfonso Cuarón and Guillermo del Toro, to produce Pan’s Labyrinth, which won three Academy Awards, three BAFTAs, a nomination for the Palme d'Or and a Golden Globe. The following year, The Hollywood Reporter named Frida Torresblanco the 32nd most powerful Latino in Hollywood [3]. She was also listed as 13th on the magazine’s list of Latino Women Power 25 [4].

Frida joined the top Spanish TV production house Zeppelin Television in 2009, where she produced many TV series with the goal of targeting American audiences with new formats. Her work at Zeppelin included the Spanish version of Big Brother, owned by Banijay group.

In 2010, Frida launched a film production company Braven Films. The company "aims to be a space for filmmakers to freely create universal, contemporary, intelligent movies that will appeal to large audiences with a unique voice". Braven focuses on independently produced cinema with universal appeal.

The company’s first film, Magic Magic, is a psychological thriller directed by Sebastián Silva and produced by Giovanna Randall, Eric Laufer, and Mike White (The White Lotus). The film was released in 2013 with a star-studded cast including Michael Cera, Juno Temple, and Emily Browning. Silva's last film The Maid (La Nana) won the Grand Jury Prize at Sundance and was nominated for a Golden Globe.

Braven Films also released Disobedience, an adaptation of Naomi Alderman’s novel, written by Rebecca Lenkiewicz and directed by Oscar winner Sebastián Lelio (Gloria, Una Mujer Fantastica). The film was produced in association with Film4, FilmNation, and Ed Guiney (Room), and starred Rachel Weisz (The Favourite), Rachel McAdams (Spotlight) and Alessandro Nivola (American Hustle).

The company’s current projects in development include Satan Is Real starring Ethan Hawke (Training Day) and Alessandro Nivola, Stolen Girl Written by Kas Graham and Rebecca Pollock, Crooked Heart in partnership with Rachel Weisz, and Visceral, a thriller directed by Frédéric Jardin (Sleepless Night, Spiral) and co-produced with Marco Cherqui (A Prophet). Their slate includes movies, TV series, and documentaries, as well as an upcoming TV series from John Curran (Chappaquiddick). In production, The Election is a documentary that is directed by Multiple Barfta Award winner and Oscar Nomine Anthony Wonke.

Frida has participated in more than 60 panels for various organizations in the industry in London, Madrid, Canada, and the United States. Her films have played at numerous film festivals, including Cannes, Berlinale, Venice, TIFF, and Sundance.

Recent career and Braven Films 

Recently Viacom International Studios (VIS) announced an exclusive agreement with Frida and Braven Films for the development and production of international content in a beneficial first-look deal.

Multiple TV series and films are currently in development as a result of this deal. Chosen Damages (US, Mexico), Artemisia (Italy), and Sinaloa's First Lady are slated for television series in conjunction with leading European production companies. Plano A Plano (in partnership with Emilio Amaré and César Benítez) and Ellos Encantados (an adaptation of a satirical Spanish novel from author Pablo Dávila Castañeda) are two of the company’s films currently in development.

Filmography 

 13 East (in development)
 Alicia (in development)
 Anna’s Truth (in development)
 Arabella (in development)
 Artemisia (in development)
 By the Waters of Babylon (in development)
 Emerald Seas (in development)
 Fragments (in development)
 Galileo (in development)
 Good Shooting (in development)
 La Cúpula de las Fieras (in development)
 Old Baggage (in development)
 Playdate (in development)
 Satan is Real (in development)
 Sinaloa’s First Lady (in development)
 Stolen Girl (in development)
 The Beast in the Garden (in development)
 The Polish Woman (in development)
 The Summer of Impossible Things (in development)
 Threesome (in development)
 2021 Man in the Attic
 2021 Omara
 2020 Greencard
 2020 Fatima
 2020 Karnawal
 2020 The Roads Not Taken
 2019 Boléro
 2018 Nigerian Prince
 2013 Magic Magic
 2010 Locked In
 2008 Rudo y Cursi
 2008 One Fast Move or I'm Gone: Kerouac's Big Sur
 2007 Year of the Nail
 2007 The Shock Doctrine
 2007 The Possibility of Hope
 2006 Pan's Labyrinth
 2005 Black Sun
 2005 Toro Negro
 2004 The Assassination of Richard Nixon
 2004 Crónicas
 2004 Duck Season
 2002 The Dancer Upstairs
 2001 Merry Christmas
 2001 Off Key
 2001 Rain
 2001 Girl from Rio
 2001 Gaudi Afternoon
 2000 Regarding Buñuel
 1997 Storm the Skies
 1993 Marathon
 1992 Orquesta Club Virginia
 1992 Christopher Columbus: The Discovery

References 

Spanish film producers
Living people
Year of birth missing (living people)